Lackawanna is a historic home at 236 Riverside Road in Front Royal, Warren County, Virginia.  The -story brick house was built in 1869 for Dorastus Cone, a merchant who moved to the area from the Lackawanna River valley in Pennsylvania.  The house has well-preserved Italianate features, including bracketed eaves and segmented-arch windows.  Distinctive features that survive include top-floor windows whose sashes rise into the attic space, and a period bathroom.

The house was listed on the National Register of Historic Places in 2014; it was designated a part of the Riverton Historic District in 2002.  It is now operated as a bed and breakfast inn.

See also
National Register of Historic Places listings in Warren County, Virginia

References

External links
Lackawanna Bed & Breakfast website

.

Bed and breakfasts in Virginia
Houses on the National Register of Historic Places in Virginia
Queen Anne architecture in Virginia
Houses completed in 1869
Houses in Warren County, Virginia
National Register of Historic Places in Warren County, Virginia
Individually listed contributing properties to historic districts on the National Register in Virginia
1869 establishments in Virginia